McKinley Heights is an unincorporated community and census-designated place in northeastern Weathersfield Township, Trumbull County, Ohio, United States. The population was 950 at the 2020 census. It is part of the Youngstown–Warren metropolitan area. The community is located at the intersection of U.S. Route 422 and Ohio State Route 169.

Geography

Demographics

McKinley Heights contains 1060 residents, in which 97% are white/caucasian. There are 533 male residents and 527 female residents of the town.

References

Unincorporated communities in Trumbull County, Ohio
Unincorporated communities in Ohio
Census-designated places in Trumbull County, Ohio
Census-designated places in Ohio